Calvin H. Wiley School, also known as the West Ward School, is a historic school building located at Salisbury, Rowan County, North Carolina.  The original building was built in 1916–1918, and is a two-story, rectangular brick building with Classical Revival style design elements. A classroom addition was built in 1921 and an auditorium and lunchroom added in 1951.  The school closed in 1983, and was subsequently renovated into apartments.

The school was named for Calvin H. Wiley, the first Superintendent of Public Instruction. It was listed on the National Register of Historic Places in 1988.

References

School buildings on the National Register of Historic Places in North Carolina
Neoclassical architecture in North Carolina
School buildings completed in 1918
Schools in Rowan County, North Carolina
National Register of Historic Places in Rowan County, North Carolina
1918 establishments in North Carolina